Negar Rural District is a rural district (dehestan) in the Central District of Bardsir County, Kerman Province, Iran. At the 2006 census, its population was 2,807, in 679 families. The rural district has 75 villages.

References 

Rural Districts of Kerman Province
Bardsir County